Matthew Gilbert "Marty" Martínez (February 14, 1929 – October 15, 2011) was a Congressional representative who was both a member of the Democratic Party and the Republican Party from California's 30th congressional district from 1982 to 1993 and California's 31st congressional district from 1993 to 2001. Martínez switched parties to become a Republican after being defeated in a 2000 primary.

Early life
Martínez's family moved to Los Angeles, California, when he was young, and he attended public schools in Los Angeles. In 1949 he graduated from Roosevelt High School. From 1947 to 1950 he served in the U.S. Marine Corps, achieving the rank of private first class. In 1956 he received a certificate of competence from the Los Angeles Trade-Technical College.

For the next fifteen years he owned and operated a custom furniture upholstery company and worked as a building contractor.

Political career
He began his political career in 1971 when he became a member of the Monterey Park Planning Commission, and served until 1974 when he was elected to the Monterey Park City Council. He served until 1980, including two terms as mayor in 1974 and 1980.

In 1980, Martínez defeated incumbent Jack R. Fenton in the Democratic primary election in California's 59th State Assembly district.  He was elected to the California State Assembly with no major-party opponent.

In 1982 George E. Danielson left the U.S. House of Representatives to take the bench.  Martínez won the special election to succeed him, and was reelected nine times by varying margins.

In his first term in Congress he was assigned to the Education and Labor Committee. In the 99th Congress (1985–87) he chaired the Subcommittee on Employment Opportunities. In 1991, he became the Chairman of the Human Resources Subcommittee. In 1992, Martínez was named to the Foreign Affairs Committee, and served on the Subcommittee on International Security, International Organizations and Human Rights.

In 2000, Martínez was defeated in the Democratic primary by liberal State Senator Hilda Solis 62% to 29%.  She charged that he was out of touch with his district when he voted to ban partial-birth abortion and opposed gun control. (He was both Roman Catholic and a member of the National Rifle Association.) While he had been a reliably Democratic vote on most issues throughout his congressional career, after his primary loss Martínez began to vote overwhelmingly with Republicans. On July 27, 2000, Martínez switched to the Republican Party, arguing that the Democrats had abandoned him. There was no Republican candidate on the ballot in the district for the 2000 election, and Martínez declined to attempt a write-in candidacy, though he remained critical of Solis and promised to stay active in the Republican party. His term in Congress ended on January 3, 2001, at the end of the 106th Congress.

Family
Martínez was married to Elvira Yorba Martinez, with whom he had five children:  Matthew Adrian, Michael Gilbert, Diane, Susan, and Carol Ann.  His daughter, Diane Martínez, served in the State Assembly from 1992 to 1998.

Death
On October 15, 2011, Martínez died at his home in Fredericksburg, Virginia. He had suffered from congestive heart failure.

Memberships
San Gabriel Valley YMCA board of directors
Hispanic American Democrats
National Association of Latino Elected and Appointed Officials
Communications Workers of America
Veterans of Foreign Wars
American Legion
Latin Business Association
Monterey Park Chamber of Commerce
Navy League (director)
Rotary International

See also

 List of American politicians who switched parties in office
List of Hispanic and Latino Americans in the United States Congress
 List of United States representatives who switched parties

References

External links

Biography from the Library of Congress
 
 
 Join California Matthew G. Martinez

|-

|-

|-

1929 births
2011 deaths
20th-century American politicians
American politicians of Mexican descent
Burials at Quantico National Cemetery
California city council members
California Republicans
Mayors of places in California
Members of the California State Assembly
Members of the United States House of Representatives from California
Military personnel from California
Hispanic and Latino American mayors in California
Hispanic and Latino American members of the United States Congress
Hispanic and Latino American state legislators in California
People from Monterey Park, California
People from Walsenburg, Colorado
United States Marines
YMCA leaders
Democratic Party members of the United States House of Representatives from California